World Aquatics, formerly known as FINA, is the international federation recognised by the International Olympic Committee (IOC) for administering international competitions in water sports. It is one of several international federations which administer a given sport or discipline for both the IOC and the international community. It is based in Lausanne, Switzerland.

Founded as FINA in 1908, the federation was officially renamed World Aquatics in January 2023.

World Aquatics currently oversees competition in six aquatics sports: 
swimming, 
diving, 
high diving,
artistic swimming, water polo, and open water swimming. World Aquatics also oversees "Masters" competition (for adults) in its disciplines.

History

FINA was founded on 19 July 1908 in the Manchester Hotel in London, UK at the end of the 1908 Summer Olympics by the Belgian, British, Danish, Finnish, French, German, Hungarian and Swedish Swimming Federations.

Number of national federations by year:
1908: 8
1928: 38
1958: 75
1978: 106
1988: 109
2000: 174
2008: 197
2010: 202
2012: 203
2015: 208
2016: 207
2017: 209

Members

In June 2017, Bhutan became the 208th national member federation of FINA (now World Aquatics); and on 30 November 2017, Anguilla became the 209th national member federation.
Members are grouped by continent, and there are 5 continental associations of which they can choose to be a member:

Africa (52): African Swimming Confederation (CANA)
Americas (45): Swimming Union of the Americas (ASUA)
Asia (45): Asia Swimming Federation (AASF)
Europe (52): European Swimming League (LEN)
Oceania (15): Oceania Swimming Association (OSA)
Note: The number following each continental name is the number of World Aquatics members which fall into the given geographical area. It is not necessarily the number of members in the continental association.

Organisation
World Aquatics' membership meets in General Congress every two years, usually coinciding with the biennial World Aquatics Championships. General Congress is World Aquatics' highest authority. Each General Congress has two voting members from each Member Federation, plus the following non-voting members: the 22 members of the World Aquatics Bureau, the Honorary Life President, and all Honorary Members. Technical issues concerning World Aquatics' six aquatic disciplines are decided by a Technical Congress which meets every four years. The Technical Congress has the following additional non-voting members: all members from the respective Technical Committees. Additional "Extraordinary Congresses" may also be called at other times, to deal with a specific topic or area of concern that arises. Congress meetings are chaired by the president of World Aquatics.

Between Congress meetings of the entire membership, a smaller 22-member representative board, called the World Aquatics Bureau, meets to act in a timely manner on items which cannot wait until the entire body can meet. It is the Bureau that elects World Aquatics' Executive Officers.

Various committees and commission also help with the oversight of individual disciplines (e.g. the Technical Open Water Swimming Committee helps with open water), or topic-related issues (e.g. the World Aquatics Doping Panel).

Presidents
Each presidential term is four years, beginning and concluding with the year following the Summer Olympics.

Events

World Aquatics Championships

World Aquatics' biggest event is the biennial World Aquatics Championships, held every odd year, where all of the six aquatic disciplines are contested. A 50m length pool is used for swimming races.

The World Open Water Swimming Championships (a.k.a. "Open Water Worlds") is part of the World Aquatics Championships. Additional standalone editions of the Open Water Championships were also held in the even years from 2000 to 2010.

The World Masters Championships (a.k.a. "Masters Worlds") – open to athletes 25 years and above in each aquatics discipline (30+ years in water polo) – has been held as part of the World Aquatics Championships since 2015. Prior to this, the Masters Championship was held separately, biennially in even years.

The World Aquatics Championship has been held biennially since 2001. Between 1978 and 1998, the World Aquatics Championship was held every 4 years, in the even year between Summer Olympic Games.

Stand-alone discipline competitions 
World Aquatics also organizes separate tournaments and series for individual disciplines, including competitions for juniors.

Discipline world tournaments 
Swimming: World Swimming Championships (25m), (a.k.a. "Short Course Worlds", an even-years biennial event, in 25m length pool)
Water polo: Men's and Women's Water Polo World Cup, replacing the former Water Polo World Leagues
Diving: Diving World Cup (biennial)
High diving: High Diving World Cup (annual)

Discipline world series 
Swimming: Swimming World Cup (annual, in 25m pools)
Diving: Diving World Series (annual)
Artistic swimming: Artistic Swimming World Cup (annual - called World Series 2017–2022)
Open water swimming: Marathon Swim World Series (annual)

Junior championships 
World-level championships restricted to a younger age, with the age limit varying by discipline and gender:
Swimming: World Junior Swimming Championships (biennial)
Water polo: Junior and Youth Water Polo World Championships (biennial)
Diving: World Junior Diving Championships (biennial)
Artistic swimming: World Junior Artistic Swimming Championships (biennial)
Open water swimming: World Junior Open Water Swimming Championships (biennial)

Sport name changes
In 2017, FINA (now World Aquatics) officially renamed the sport of synchronised swimming as Artistic Swimming for its competitions to reflect the expansion in evaluation criteria in the sport to include not only synchronization but other elements such as choreography and artistic expression as well.

Bans

Retired athletes
In relation to anti-doping rule violations, World Aquatics does enact suspensions on athletes who are retired from their respective sport at the time of ban implementation, with examples including Lithuanian Rūta Meilutytė (2019–2021) and Russians Artem Lobuzov (2021–2025), Alexandra Sokolova (2021–2025), and Artem Podyakov (2021–2025).

Russia and Belarus bans
Russian and Belarusian athletes and officials were banned from every FINA (World Aquatics) event through the end of 2022. FINA also cancelled FINA events in Russia, and banned Russian and Belarusian teams through to the 19th FINA World Championships Budapest 2022. In March 2022, after the 2022 Russian invasion of Ukraine, FINA banned all Russians and Belarusians from competing at the 2022 World Aquatics Championships and withdrew the 2022 FINA World Swimming Championships (25 m) from being held in Russia. This came after indefinitely banning athletes and officials of both countries from wearing the colours of their country, swimming representing their country with their country's name, and the playing of their country's national anthem in case an athlete from either country won an event. Additionally, times swum by Russians at non-FINA competitions for the April to December 2022 time frame did not count for world rankings nor world records.

Controversies

Soul Cap
In 2021, FINA (World Aquatics) came under criticism for not approving the use at the Olympics of the Soul Cap, a brand of swimming caps designed for natural Black hair. FINA said the caps did not fit "the natural form of the head" and to their "best knowledge the athletes competing at the international events never used, neither require … caps of such size and configuration." After receiving criticism about racism, FINA announced that they would review their decision. Later in 2022, FINA decided to approve the Soul Caps for future FINA events (effective immediately)

Transgender athlete restrictions 

On 19 June 2022, FINA (World Aquatics) "committed to the separation of Aquatics sports into men's and women's categories according to sex" by a 71% vote, adopting a new policy on eligibility for the men's and women's competition categories. This policy effectively bars all transgender women from competing in professional women's swimming, with the exception of athletes who "can establish to FINA's comfortable satisfaction that they have not experienced any part of male puberty beyond Tanner Stage 2 (of puberty) or before age 12, whichever is later". FINA also announced the development of a separate "open" category for some events, to be determined by a working group over the next six months, so that "everybody has the opportunity to compete at an elite level". The decision was criticized as "discriminatory, harmful, unscientific and not in line with the 2021 IOC principles" by LGBT advocacy group Athlete Ally.

See also
History of competitive swimwear
FINA Athletes of the Year
World Aquatics Day
International Swimming Hall of Fame (ISHOF)
List of swimming competitions
List of international sport federations
Major achievements in swimming by nation

Notes

References

External links
Official website

 
Swimming organizations

International sports organizations
Sports organizations established in 1908
1908 establishments in England
Aquatics
IOC-recognised international federations
Organisations based in Lausanne